Ethelreda, Etheldreda or Ethreda was a daughter of Gospatric, Earl of Northumbria remembered in 13th century Cumberland as the mother of William fitz Duncan. 

She married Duncan II of Scotland, King of Alba. Ethelreda was Queen Consort of Alba for about six months in 1094, until Duncan's death on 12 November 1094. 

After Duncan was killed by Mormaer Máel Petair of Mearns, it is probable that Ethelreda fled with at least one child, William fitz Duncan, to the safety of Allerdale in Cumberland, where her brother Waltheof was lord. 

The Chronicon Cumbriæ reports that Waltheof granted Broughton, Ribton and Little Broughton jointly to his sister Ethelreda and Waltheof, son of Gillemin, who would be another husband. More of Waltheof of Allerdale's lands would eventually be inherited by Ethelreda's son William fitz Duncan.

References

 William M. Aird, "Gospatric, earl of Northumbria (d. 1073x5)", Oxford Dictionary of National Biography, Oxford University Press, 2004 , retrieved 13 Feb 2009
 A. A. M. Duncan, "Duncan II (b. before 1072, d. 1094)", Oxford Dictionary of National Biography, Oxford University Press, 2004 , retrieved 13 Feb 2009
 James Wilson, ed., The Register of the Priory of St. Bees, Surtees Society, 1915, pp. 491–5 

Scottish royal consorts
11th-century Scottish people
11th-century Scottish women
House of Dunkeld